Loughnan St Lawrence Pendred was a UK mechanical engineer and editor of The Engineer, a weekly newspaper for engineers, from 1906 to 1946. 

He was born in 1870, the son of Vaughan Pendred, who preceded him as editor, and he died in 1953, by which time the editorship had passed to his own son, Benjamin Pendred. In all, the Pendred family were editors of The Engineer for more than a century (102 years to be exact).

In 1930, Loughnan Pendred was president of the Institution of Mechanical Engineers.

1870 births
1953 deaths
British mechanical engineers
British editors